Deh-e Kowsar (also Romanized as Deh-e Kows̄ar and Deh Kows̄ar) is a village in Hendudur Rural District, Sarband District, Shazand County, Markazi Province, Iran. At the 2006 census, its population was 277, in 64 families.

References 

Populated places in Shazand County